Indian Association for the Cultivation of Science (IACS) is a public, deemed, research university for higher education and research in basic sciences under the Department of Science & Technology, Government of India, situated at the heart of the Cultural capital of India. Established in 1876 by Mahendralal Sarkar, a private medical practitioner, it focuses on fundamental research in basic sciences. It is Asia's oldest research institute Located at Jadavpur, South Kolkata near Jadavpur University, Central Glass and Ceramic Research Institute and Indian Institute of Chemical Biology. It is spread over a limited area of 9.5 acres and currently in the process of building an advanced SMART campus at Baruipur.

The association is engaged in research in various fields of physics, chemistry, biological sciences, mathematical and computational sciences, materials sciences and various interdisciplinary areas.

Indian Journal of Physics (IJP) 
Indian Journal of Physics was founded in 1926. It is published monthly. Springer distributes print version of the Journal worldwide. The present chief editor of the journal is Prof. Subham Majumdar, who is a senior professor in the School of Physical Sciences, IACS.

Second Campus (Offshore Campus at Baruipur)
Union Minister of Science and Technology, Dr. Harsha Vardhan unveiled the foundation stone of the Syamaprasad Mukherjee Advanced Research and Training (SMART) campus of Indian Association for the Cultivation of Science(IACS) at Baruipur. It will have the facilities for cutting-edge research in multiple disciplines such as fundamental sciences, engineering sciences and medical sciences.

Academic Divisions 
Starting from 2018, after being declared as a deemed university by MHRD, for academic purposes, departments and centres in the Institute are broadly assigned to six major schools, each headed by a Chairperson (School Chair):

 School of Applied and Interdisciplinary Sciences (SAIS)
 School of Biological Sciences (SBS)
 School of Chemical Sciences (SCS)
 School of Materials Sciences (SMS)
 School of Mathematical and Computational Sciences (SMCS)
 School of Physical Sciences (SPS)

Apart from these six major schools, there are a few centers, designed to perform specific and cutting-edge research, by the institute administration:

 Centre for Computer Research, Education and Services (CCRES)
 Director's Research Unit (DRU)
 Technical Research Center (TRC)
 Central Scientific Services (CSS)
 Raman Centre of Atomic, Molecular & Optical Sciences
 Polymer Structural Unit
 Energy Research Unit

Administration

At its inception, the IACS was headed by a President, with the Honorary Secretary responsible for the day-to-day running of the Society. Until 1911, the office of President was de facto held by the Lieutenant-Governor of Bengal, when the Lieutenant-Governor (Governor from 1912) became the co-patron of the Society alongside the Viceroy of India, whose office-holders were automatically Patrons of the Society until 1947. Following India's independence in 1947, the administration of the IACS was reconstituted, with the designation of "Honorary Director" substituted for "Honorary Secretary." The Director's prefix of "Honorary" was dropped in 1953.

Presidents of the IACS (1876-present)
Sir Richard Temple, 1st Baronet FRS (1876-1877)
The Hon. Sir Ashley Eden FASB (1877-1882)
Sir Augustus Rivers Thompson (1882-1887)
Sir Steuart Bayley (1887-1890)
Sir Charles Alfred Elliott FASB (1890-1895)
Sir Alexander Mackenzie (1895-1898)
Sir John Woodburn (1898-1903)
Sir Andrew Henderson Leith Fraser FASB (1903-1909)
Sir Edward Norman Baker (1909-1911)
Raja Pyare Mohan Mukherjee  FASB (1911-1922)
Hon. Justice Sir Ashutosh Mukherjee FASB, FRSE, FRAS, MRIA (1922-1924)
Sir Rajendra Nath Mookerjee FASB (1924-1934?)
Sir Nilratan Sircar (1934-1942)
Prof. Rai Bahadur Sir Upendranath Brahmachari FNI, FASB (1942-1946)
Prof. Meghnad Saha FNI, FASB, FRS (1946-1951)
Prof. Sir Jnan Chandra Ghosh FNI (1951-1954)
Hon. Justice Charu Chandra Biswas (1954-1957)
Hon. Chief Justice Phani Bhusan Chakravartti (1957-1958)
Prof. Satyendra Nath Bose FNI, FRS (1958-1962)
Hon. Justice Rama Prasad Mookerjee (1962-1965)
Prof. Jnanendra Nath Mukherjee FNI, FCS (1965-1968)
Prof. Basanti Dulal Nagchaudhuri FNA (first term, 1968–1970)
Prof. Sushil Kumar Mukherjee FNA (first term, 1970–1973)
Prof. Sukumar Chandra Sirkar FNA (1973-1974)
Prof. Basanti Dulal Nagchaudhuri FNA (second term, 1974–1977)
Prof. Bimal Kumar Bachhawat FNA (1977-1983)
Prof. Sushil Kumar Mukherjee FNA (second term, 1983–1997)
Prof. Arun Kumar Sharma FNA, FASc (1997-2000)
Prof. M. M. Chakraborty (2000-2003)
Prof. Ashesh Prosad Mitra FNA, FASc, FRS (2003-2007)
Prof. Shri Krishna Joshi FNA, FASc (2007-2014)
Prof. Man Mohan Sharma  FNA, FASc, FRS, FREng (2014–2021)
Prof. Srivari Chandrasekhar, FNA, FASc (2021 – 2022)
Prof. Vinod K. Singh, FNA, FASc, FNASc, FTWAS (2022 - present)

Secretaries and Directors of the IACS

Honorary Secretaries of the IACS (1876-1947)

Honorary Directors of the IACS (1947-1953)

Directors of the IACS (1953-present)

Notable alumni and associates

Nobel Laureate 

 Sir C.V. Raman, FRS, Former Faculty of IACS

Bharat Ratna (Highest Civil Honor in India) 

 Sir C.V. Raman, FRS, Former Faculty of IACS
 Prof. C.N.R. Rao, FRS, Former Chairman of Review Committee of IACS

Fellow of the Royal Society (FRS), London 

 Sir J. C. Bose, former faculty of IACS
 Sir C. V. Raman, former faculty of IACS
 Prof. Meghnad Saha, former faculty and Director of IACS
 K. S. Krishnan, alumnus, former faculty of IACS
 S. N. Bose, former faculty of IACS
 A. P. Mitra, former Chairman of the IACS Council
 C. N. R. Rao, former Chairman of the Review Committee of IACS and IACS Fellow
 M. M. Sharma, former Chairman of the IACS Governing Council and IACS Fellow
 TV Ramakrishnan (IACS Fellow)
 Ajay Sood (IACS Fellow)

Padma Vibhushan (Civil Honor in India) 

 C. N. R. Rao, former Chairman of the Review Committee of IACS and IACS Fellow
 M. M. Sharma, former Chairman of the IACS Governing Council and IACS Fellow

Padma Bhusan (Civil Honor in India) 

 K. S. Krishnan, alumnus, former faculty of IACS
Padma Shri (Civil Honor in India)

 Vinod K. Singh, Chairman of Governing Council, IACS

TWAS Prize 

 C. N. R. Rao, former Chairman of the Review Committee of IACS and IACS Fellow
 Animesh Chakravorty, former faculty of IACS
 Kankan Bhattacharyya, former student, faculty and Director of IACS
 Santanu Bhattacharya, former Director of IACS
D. D. Sharma, former faculty member, IACS

Alexander von Humboldt Research Award 

 D. Mukherjee, former student, faculty and Director of IACS

Fellow of the World Academy of Sciences (FTWAS) 

 C. N. R. Rao, former Chairman of the Review Committee of IACS and IACS Fellow
 D. Mukherjee, former student, faculty and Director of IACS
 Kankan Bhattacharyya, former student, faculty and Director of IACS
 Santanu Bhattacharya, former Director of IACS
 T. Saha-Dasgupta, former Faculty of IACS

Shanti Swarup Bhatnagar (SSB) Prize 

 K. S. Krishnan, alumnus, former faculty of IACS
 S. Basu, received in 1965, former faculty of IACS
 C. N. R. Rao, former Chairman of the Review Committee of IACS and IACS Fellow
 U. R. Ghatak, former Director and faculty of IACS
 Animesh Chakravorty, former faculty of IACS
 Mihir Chowdhury, former faculty of IACS
 D. Mukherjee, former student, faculty and Director of IACS
 Kankan Bhattacharyya, former student, faculty and Director of IACS
 Akhil R. Chakravarty, former Student of IACS
 D. S. Ray, former student and faculty of IACS
 Sourav Pal, former student of IACS
 Santanu Bhattacharya, former Director of IACS
 Samaresh Bhattacharya, former Student of IACS
 Krishnendu Sengupta, present faculty member, IACS
 Pradyut Ghosh, present faculty member, IACS
 P. S. Mukherjee, former Student of IACS
 Jyotirmayee Dash, present faculty member, IACS

Notable research works 
Nobel laureate Sir C. V. Raman conducted his work on the Raman effect in this institute. His work was first published in the Indian Journal of Physics, which is published by IACS.

At the university, Debashis Mukherjee developed the Mk-MRCC method to account for electron correlations in molecular systems. Another important discovery has been in the area of solvation dynamics of molecules and in particular the dynamics of water molecules around the surfaces of membranes. These experiments performed by Professor Kankan Bhattacharyya provided an insight into the behavior of water near biological surfaces and led to his coining of the phrase "biological water".

Notes

References

External links
 
Ray–Dutt twist
Raman Effect
 

Nanotechnology institutions
Deemed universities in India
Research institutes in West Bengal
Research institutes in Kolkata
Council of Scientific and Industrial Research
1876 establishments in India
Scientific organizations established in 1876
Educational institutions established in 1876